Clarence Dennis Coughlin (July 27, 1883 – December 15, 1946) was a Republican U.S. Representative from Pennsylvania.

Biography
Clarence Coughlin (uncle of Lawrence Coughlin) was born in Kingston, Pennsylvania. He was the son of James M. Coughlin, who was the superintendent of Wilkes-Barre school area and would later have a school named after his death. He attended Wesleyan University in Middletown, Connecticut, and Harvard College. He taught in the Wilkes-Barre High School from 1906 to 1910. He studied law, was admitted to the bar in 1910 and practiced law in Luzerne County, Pennsylvania, from 1910 to 1920.

In 1912, Coughlin unsuccessfully ran for Congress under the Progressive Party banner, coming in ahead of incumbent Republican Charles Bowman but ultimately losing to John Casey.

He was engaged in manufacturing, banking, and the development of real estate in Wilkes-Barre and Scranton. He served as a member of the committee of public safety of the State and county in 1918, and served six years as a member of the commission to revise the penal code of Pennsylvania. He was chairman of the Republican county committee of Luzerne County from 1915 to 1917.

Coughlin was elected as a Republican to the 67th Congress, during which he served as chairman of the United States House Committee on Expenditures in the Department of Commerce. He was an unsuccessful candidate for reelection in 1922. He was appointed judge of the Luzerne County Court of Common Pleas in 1925 to fill an unexpired term caused by the death of Judge Woodward. He was elected in November 1927 for a ten-year term and served until 1937.

Death
Coughlin died in Wilkes-Barre, Pennsylvania, aged 63. He is interred in Mount Greenwood Cemetery in Trucksville, Pennsylvania.

References

External links
 
The Political Graveyard

Pennsylvania lawyers
Pennsylvania state court judges
American bankers
People from the Scranton–Wilkes-Barre metropolitan area
People from Kingston, Pennsylvania
Harvard College alumni
Wesleyan University alumni
1883 births
1946 deaths
Republican Party members of the United States House of Representatives from Pennsylvania
20th-century American judges
20th-century American politicians
20th-century American lawyers
Judges of the Pennsylvania Courts of Common Pleas